Old Oak Lane Halt railway station was the first station on the "New North Main Line" (NNML, present-day Acton–Northolt line) of the Great Western Railway. It served the area between North Acton and Old Oak Common, and was in use between 1906 and 1947. At least one of the platform shelters was of the Pagoda pattern.

History
The station was opened by the Great Western Railway Company on 1 October 1906 within the complex of lines at the south east end of the New North Main Line, a location with low potential for passenger traffic.

The station closed temporarily on 1 February 1915, reopening on 29 March 1920.

The station closed permanently on 30 June 1947 without a replacement when the Central line of London Underground was extended from North Acton to West Ruislip alongside the NNML under the 1935-1940 New Works Programme delayed by World War II.

Old Oak Common 

As part of the plans for HS2 there are plans for a major interchange between the North London Line, the West London Line, Watford DC Line, West Coast Main Line, Great Western Main Line and Crossrail.

See also
List of closed railway stations in London

References

External links
Old Oak Lane Halt on navigable 1945 O.S. map

Former Great Western Railway stations
Disused railway stations in the London Borough of Ealing
Railway stations in Great Britain opened in 1906
Railway stations in Great Britain closed in 1915
Railway stations in Great Britain opened in 1920
Railway stations in Great Britain closed in 1947